The Zdzisław Krzyszkowiak's City Stadium is a multi-use stadium in Bydgoszcz, Poland.  It was completed in 1960 with a capacity of about 35,944 on wooden benches.  The stadium was completely rebuilt in 2007–2008, and the current seating capacity is 20,247 people. It is currently used for football matches and track and field events. The stadium is named after Polish Olympic gold medal-winning runner Zdzisław Krzyszkowiak.

Athletics 
Zdzisław Krzyszkowiak Stadium has hosted several national athletic competitions:
 14 of 94 all Polish national senior athletics championships (last in 2016)
and at the international level:
 1999 - World Youth Championships
 2000 - European Cup First League
 2001 - European Relay Festival
 2003 - European Athletics U23 Championships
 2004 - European Cup
 2008, 2016 - World Junior Championships in Athletics
 2017 - European Athletics U23 Championships
 2019 - European Team Championships
 2021 - World Para Athletics European Championships

Football 
It has hosted 10 international matches of the Poland national football team. In 2017 the stadium was one of the venues of the 2017 UEFA European Under-21 Championship. In 2019 it's one of the venues of the 2019 FIFA U-20 World Cup.

Gallery

See also 

Stadion Miejski Polonii (Bydgoszcz)

References

External links 
 zawisza.bydgoszcz.pl - official webpage of CWZS Zawisza Bydgoszcz multi-sport club

Athletics (track and field) venues in Poland
Bydgoszcz
Sport in Bydgoszcz
Buildings and structures in Bydgoszcz
Zawisza Bydgoszcz
Sports venues in Kuyavian-Pomeranian Voivodeship